National Highway 303, commonly referred to as NH 303, is a highway connecting the city of Nagrota Bagwan  to Nadaun in Himachal Pradesh.

References

External links
 Openstreetmap 

National highways in India
National Highways in Himachal Pradesh